Antoun Sehnaoui is a Lebanese banker and film producer, He is the chairman of the board of the SGBL Group, comprising the Société Générale de Banque au Liban (SGBL), the Société Générale de Banque in Jordan (SGBJ) and financial company Fidus Wealth Management. He is also the chairman of the board of the Compagnie Financière Richelieu, a European banking group comprising Banque Richelieu France, Banque Richelieu Monaco and Richelieu Gestion. He is also a member of the board of the Lebanese Banking Association, and a member of the Academy of Motion Picture Arts and Sciences.

Early life and education 
Sehnaoui was born in Beirut on November 3, 1972, to Nabil Sehnaoui and May Chehab Sehnaoui, the great-granddaughter of Emir Bashir Shihab II, who ruled Lebanon in the first half of the 19th century. He grew up in Lebanon during the Lebanese Civil War and attended the Collège Notre-Dame de Jamhour, then moved on to the United States where he graduated from the University of Southern California.

Banking 
Sehnaoui suddenly became chairman of the SGBL Group in October 2007. In 2011 SGBL acquired most of the assets of the Lebanese Canadian Bank and in 2017 it expanded into the United Arab Emirates, opening a fully owned subsidiary within the Abu Dhabi Global Market, and into the USA market by acquiring Pikes Peak National Bank in Colorado. SGBL is the third largest bank in Lebanon in terms of deposits and assets, and the fourth in terms of profitability. Sehnaoui expanded into Europe in 2018 with the acquisition of Banque Richelieu in France and Monaco.

Media 
In 1998, Sehnaoui created NewsMedia SAL, a publishing company and then Executive (magazine), an independent business magazine for Lebanon and the GCC countries. Executive is a publication concerning economic and financial matters across the Middle East and North Africa (MENA) region. In 2010, Executive became a member of the Business Publications Audit (BPA) Worldwide. Yasser Akkaoui is the editor-in-chief of Executive.

Film production 
Sehnaoui is a partner in the production company "Rouge International" in collaboration with French actress and producer Julie Gayet, and founded the production company "Ezekiel Film Production". The movie Clouds of Sils Maria was released in 2014 and went on to receive over 25 awards nominations and 9 wins including the César Award for best supporting actress for Kristen Stewart. The movie The Insult was released in 2017 and was selected as the Lebanese entry for the Best Foreign Language Film and was nominated for the Oscar at the 90th Academy Awards.

Philanthropy and sponsorships 
Sehnaoui supports the Beirut International Film Festival, the Beirut Art Center, the French Book Fair and more than a dozen arts and cultural festivals a year. He agreed to lend an antique bed bought at auction at Bonhams of London to Ordsall Hall for a duration of five years.

He is also a patron of Lebanese sports through a partnership with the National Basketball Federation and by a US$7 million donation in 2017 for the financing of the new sports center of the Lebanese American University (LAU)

Sehnaoui donated, in the name of his parents, the Saint Charbel Makhlouf Shrine in St. Patrick's Cathedral (Manhattan) in New-York city that was inaugurated on October 28 of 2017. The inauguration ceremony was attended by Lebanese Maronite Patriarch Bechara Boutros al-Rahi as well as Cardinal Timothy M. Dolan. The shrine features a mosaic of Saint Charbel Makhlouf along with national Lebanese emblems such as the lebanese cedar and a relic of the Saint.

He is also a patron of animal rights activists.

Tarek Yatim's case 
In 2015, Tarek Yatim who is believed to be the bodyguard of Antoun Sahnaoui, stabbed to death a Lebanese citizen George Rif during a roadrage incident. However, Sehnaoui denied any link between him and the case in question.

See also 

 Marwan Kheireddine
 Salim Sfeir

References

External links 
 Antoun Sehnaoui's personal website

Living people
University of Southern California alumni
1972 births
Lebanese film producers
Lebanese Melkite Greek Catholics
Lebanese businesspeople
Lebanese bankers